Gordon Thomson may refer to:

 Gordon Thomson (actor) (born 1945), Canadian actor
 Gordon Thomson (rower) (1884–1953), British rower
 Gordon Thomson (badminton) (born 1985), Scottish badminton player
 Gordon Thomson (Christmas Island administrator), former Shire of Christmas Island; General Secretary of the Union of Christmas Island Workers

See also
 Gordon Thompson (disambiguation)